Acraea barberi, or Barber's acraea, is a butterfly of the family Nymphalidae. It is found in South Africa only in hilly wooded savannah in Gauteng, Limpopo and North West.

The wingspan is 55–66 mm for males and 60–72 mm for females. Adults are on wing from October to December with peaks in October and February.

The larvae feed on Adenia glauca.

Acraea barberi is a member of the Acraea zetes species group-   but see also Pierre & Bernaud, 2014

References

IUCN Red List least concern species
Butterflies described in 1881
barberi
Endemic insects of South Africa
Butterflies of Africa
Taxa named by Roland Trimen